Live in New York City may refer to:

 Across a Wire: Live in New York City, 1998 album by Counting Crows
 Barney Live in New York City, video of a Barney & Friends 1994 stage show
 Bruce Springsteen & The E Street Band: Live in New York City, 1999–2000 Reunion Tour film by HBO
 Evil or Divine – Live in New York City, video album recorded in 2002 by Dio
 Live in New York City (Dave Matthews Band album), recorded and released in 2010
 Live in New York City (John Lennon album), recorded 1972, released posthumously in 1986
 Live in New York City (Natasha Bedingfield video), recorded and released in 2006
 Live in New York City 12-31-05, 2006 EP by Trey Anastasio
 Mind Body & Soul Sessions: Live in New York City, 2004 DVD video album by Joss Stone
 Live in New York City, 2012 live video and album by Paul Simon

See also
 Live in NYC (disambiguation)
 Live in New York (disambiguation)
 Live from New York City, 1967, by Simon and Garfunkel